Gio Ponti (foaled February 28, 2005 in Kentucky) is an American Thoroughbred race horse who was the Champion Turf Horse in 2009 and 2010, and finished second to Zenyatta in the 2009 Breeder's Cup Classic. He was sired by Tale of the Cat, a son of Storm Cat, out of the stakes-placed Alydar mare Chipeta Springs, making him half-brother to stakes-winner Fisher Pond.

During his racing career, Gio Ponti was owned by Castleton Lyons and trained by Christophe Clement.

Racing career 
Named for a  well-known Italian artist and architect, Gio Ponti began racing in the silks of Shane Ryan's Castleton Lyons Farm under trainer Christophe Clement and broke his maiden in his first start as a two-year-old at Belmont Park, winning by 2½ lengths. He was then was entered in the Bourbon Stakes at Keeneland in his second start, where he scored the first stakes win of his career. After an unplaced effort in the Breeders' Cup Juvenile Turf, he was given time off to prepare for his 3-year-old campaign.

At 3, Gio Ponti gained graded stakes success in the G3 Hill Prince Stakes at Belmont, the G2 Virginia Derby at Colonial Downs, and the G3 Sir Beaufort Stakes at Santa Anita.  He was also runner up in the G2 Del Mar Derby at Del Mar and the G2 Jamaica Handicap at Belmont.  By the end of his three-year-old year, he had $820,800 in career earnings over turf and synthetic surfaces.

At age 4, the bay colt won four consecutive Grade One races:  the Frank E. Kilroe Mile Handicap, Manhattan Handicap, Man o' War Stakes, and Arlington Million, making him one of the favorites for the Breeders' Cup Turf. After an upset in the Turf Classic Invitational, his owners decided to point him towards the Breeders' Cup Classic instead, which was run at a more favorable distance of 1¼ miles, as opposed to the Turf's 1½ mile distance. However, Gio Ponti lost to the then-undefeated mare Zenyatta.

Shortly after the Breeders' Cup Classic, Gio Ponti's connections announced he would remain in training for 2010 and be pointed toward the Dubai World Cup. He started the year with a second in the Tampa Bay stakes. In the Dubai World Cup, he was boxed in and then went to the far outside, finishing fourth.

In 2010, Gio Ponti first raced at Belmont Park, where he was second in the Manhattan Handicap, and first in the Man O' War Stakes. He then ran in the Arlington Million but lost to Debussy. At Keeneland Race Course in Lexington, Kentucky, under jockey Ramon Dominguez he won the Shadwell Turf Mile Stakes, earning a spot in the Breeders' Cup with a "Win and You're In" berth. In the 2010 Breeders' Cup Mile, Gio Ponti ran second to the future U.S. Racing Hall of Fame mare Goldikova. As Clement once put it, "He is very well educated - ladies first." His efforts earned him the title of Eclipse Male Turf champion for the second straight year.

In 2011, Gio Ponti won the Grade 1 Shadwell Mile, finished second in the Arlington Million and Man O' War, and ran fourth in his fourth Breeders’ Cup start, this time in the Mile. He earned $6.1 million in 28 starts, making him one of the richest Thoroughbreds in America of all time.

Pedigree

Race record

External links
 Gio Ponti's pedigree and partial racing stats

References

2005 racehorse births
Racehorses bred in Kentucky
Racehorses trained in the United States
Eclipse Award winners
Thoroughbred family 2-g